American folk rock duo Simon & Garfunkel recorded songs for five studio albums. Consisting of guitarist/singer-songwriter Paul Simon and singer Art Garfunkel, the duo first met as children in Forest Hills, Queens, New York in 1953, where they first learned to harmonize with one another and began writing original material.

By 1957, the teenagers had their first minor success with "Hey Schoolgirl", a song imitating their idols the Everly Brothers. In 1963, they regrouped and were signed to Columbia Records. Their debut, Wednesday Morning, 3 A.M., sold poorly, and they once again disbanded.

A remix of their song "The Sound of Silence" gained airplay on U.S. radio in 1965, hitting number one on the Billboard Hot 100. Simon & Garfunkel reunited, releasing their second studio album Sounds of Silence and touring colleges nationwide. Their third release, Parsley, Sage, Rosemary and Thyme (1966), found the duo assuming more creative control.

Their music was featured in the 1967 film The Graduate, propelling the duo to further exposure. Bookends (1968), their next album, benefited from this promotion, and increased their profile. Their often rocky relationship led to artistic disagreements, resulting in their 1970 breakup. Their final studio record, Bridge Over Troubled Water, was subsequently their most successful, becoming one of the world's best-selling albums.

This list comprises their core studio work, including their songs under the name Tom and Jerry. The duo's multiple live albums contain cover songs as well as music from their respective solo careers; only said cover songs are listed here. In all, Simon & Garfunkel recorded and released 75 songs, including nineteen songs as Tom and Jerry.

Songs

Notes

References

Sources

External links
Simon & Garfunkel

 
Simon and Garfunkel